The 3rd Kuwaiti Federation Cup started on October 2, 2009.

The third Federation Cup is one of four competitions in the Kuwaiti 2009/2010 season. 14 clubs are taking part in the tournament.

They were divided into two groups of seven, and the winner and runner-up of each group will advance to the semi-finals.

The cup is used as a curtain raiser to the Kuwaiti Premier League season.

Groups

Fixtures and results

Group 1

Group 2

Semi-finals

Final

Kuwait Federation Cup
2009–10 domestic association football cups
2009–10 in Kuwaiti football